Port-de-Paix (or ; meaning "Port of Peace") is a commune and the capital of the Nord-Ouest department of Haiti on the Atlantic coast. It has a population of 462,000 (2015 IHSI estimate). Port-de-Paix used to be a large exporter of bananas and coffee.

Geography
The city of Port-de-Paix located on a small coastal plain on the Atlantic coast of Hayti in the Tortuga Canal on the bank of Three-Rivers in an area marked by agricultural activities. 

The communes comprises: 
 I. The urban centre of Port-de-Paix
II. Baudin
III. Aubert
IV. Mahotière
V. Bas-des-Moustiques
VI. La Corne

Port-de-Paix is also the chief town of an arrondissement of the same name. The arrondissement consists of five communes: Port-de-Paix, La Pointe des Palmistes, Bassin-Bleu, Chansolme and Tortuga.

History

Early History
During the Amerindian period this area was called "Xarama" by the Taïno people. The area around the town was given the name "Valparaíso" by Christopher Columbus after landing here in the late evening of December 6, 1492, and today still contains many attractive beaches and cave locations. A ferry operates between the town and Tortuga island, (La Tortue), called "Gusaeni Cahini" by the Taïnos, which is situated just across the water.

From 1600 to 1800
The town was founded in 1665 by French filibusters, driven from Tortuga Island by the British occupiers. In 1676 the capital of the French Colony of Saint-Domingue was moved from Tortuga to Port-de-Paix, and it remained the seat of government until 1711 when the capital was moved to Cap-Français. In 1676, Padrejean escaped from slavery in the Port.  In 1679 the town saw the first black slave revolt. The area saw great success during the 18th century but on February 27, 1903, the town was almost entirely destroyed by fire, and never attained its former status.

Liberation
In 1803, following the step of Maurepas, the general Francois Lamort Cappois and the 9th demi-brigade the french soldiers evacuated the city.

Transportation
Port-de-Paix is served by Port-de-Paix Airport. The RN5 connects the city to Gonaives in the Artibonite Department, the R117 connects ic to Limbé in the Guarico Department and the R151 connects it to Mole-St-Nicolas in proposed Quisqueya Department. The main streets are Stenio-Vincent, Capois, du Quai.

A ferry connets the island of Tortuga to Port-de-Paix.

Notable people
 Hurby Azor
 Eliezer Cadet

Media
 Le Novateur
Kreyolofoni

Radio
 Radio Génération80 88.9fm
Radio Tele Arnold Fm 96.9  https://www.radiotelearnoldfm.com
Radio Toxic FM 91.3
Radio Télé diffusion du Nord-Ouest (RTNO)92.5 & ch.6
Radio Balade FM 102.3 MHz http://www.radiobalade.com
Radio Melodie Inter 98.3
http://www.radiomelodieinter.com
Radio New Star 104.1
Radio Planète FM 100.7 
Radio Télé Universelle Plus (TRUP)103.5 FM & Ch.10
Radio Voix Eglise Bethanie 94.3 FM  
Radio Voix de la Paix 94.7 FM
Radio Harmonie Inter 101.5 Fm Stereo http://www.radioharmonieinter.com
Radio Couleur FM 93.9 FM  Stereo 
Radio Télé Ideal Plus 89.7 ch.40
Radio Castro Inter 97.1 
Radio Excel Inter 106.7
Radio Dary FM 97.5
Radio Paismesbrebis 93.5
Radio natal 96.7
Radio Cosmos Inter 101.1 
Radio Perfection 105.7
Radio Clean FM 95.1 
Radio capoix FM 106.3
Radio Tele Port-de-Paix 88.3
Radio magnitude fm 98.7 http://www.radiomagnitudefm.com
Radio expression FM 98.9
Radio union plus 92.1
Radio omega 91.9

References

 
Populated places in Nord-Ouest (department)
Populated places established in 1665
Communes of Haiti
1665 establishments in the French colonial empire
Port cities in the Caribbean